Fantasy Girl may refer to:

"Fantasy Girl", a 1980 song by 38 Special from Wild-Eyed Southern Boys
"Fantasy Girl", a 2010 song by Man Overboard from Real Talk